Bhakta Raj Acharya (born on 1999 B.S or 1942 A.D), commonly referred to as Bhajan Shiromani, is a Nepali singer and music-composer. Widely known as the greatest singers of all time in Nepal. He was born in Dhankuta, Nepal and raised in Kalimpong, India. He moved to Nepal in 1970's during the flock of Darjeeling singers to Nepal.  Bhakta Raj Acharya has very beautiful Hymns or Bhajans sung in Nepali language and is entitled as the Bhajan Shiromani of Nepal. Acharya's career started in 2030 B.S after he won a gold medal in an All Nepal Song Competition held by Radio Nepal. His career spanned until 2046 B.S.  He has about 450 recorded songs and has composed about 25-30 songs.

Now his sons, Satya Raj Acharya and Sworoop Raj Acharya also known jointly as Satya-Swaroop, have followed their father's footsteps with them and have established themselves as promising singers are geared up to bring the real-life story of their father into real-life.

Popular songs by Bhakta Raj Acharya

Songs

Bhajan

Popular culture 
In 2011 A.D, a renowned filmmaker from Sikkim Prashant Rasaily directed the movie "Acharya", which was based on the life of Bhaktaraj Acharya. It received a good response by the movie critics. Bhaktraj's son, Satya Raj Acharya, played the character of Bhaktaraj Acharya on the movie.

References

External links 
 

1942 births
Living people
People from Dhankuta
21st-century Nepalese male singers
Nepalese composers
Bhajan singers
Khas people